Marcel De Falco (born 6 January 1962) is a French former professional football player and manager.

Playing career 
De Falco was a graduate of the Marseille academy. He made a total of 82 appearances for the club before joining Paris Saint-Germain in 1983, at the age of 21.

De Falco made his PSG debut in a 0–0 draw against his future club Laval on 27 December 1983. He scored his first and only goal for the Parisians in a 3–1 victory against Saint-Étienne on 11 February 1984. On 14 March 1984, De Falco played his final match for PSG, a 2–1 defeat to Sochaux. He transferred to Laval in the summer of 1984, after a "disappointing" season in the capital of France.

After leaving Laval in 1985, De Falco continued his career at Orléans, Béziers, Valence, Stade Ruthénois, Marseille Endoume, and Cassis.

Managerial career 
After retiring in 1998, De Falco went on to manage FA Val Durance.

Career statistics

References 

1962 births
Living people

French footballers
French football managers
Footballers from Marseille
Association football forwards
Ligue 1 players
Ligue 2 players
Olympique de Marseille players
Paris Saint-Germain F.C. players
Stade Lavallois players
US Orléans players
AS Béziers Hérault (football) players
ASOA Valence players
Rodez AF players
US Marseille Endoume players
SO Cassis Carnoux players
French Division 3 (1971–1993) players
French Division 4 (1978–1993) players